Aleksandr Leonidovich Deryomov (October 28, 1949 – 2004) was a Soviet football player. He was born in Rostov Oblast.

International career
Deryomov played his only game for USSR on August 5, 1973, in a friendly against Sweden.

External links
 Profile
 Mention of Aleksandr Deryomov's death

1949 births
2004 deaths
Soviet footballers
Soviet Union international footballers
FC APK Morozovsk players
FC Rostov players
FC Zenit Saint Petersburg players
FC Spartak Vladikavkaz players
Russian footballers
Association football defenders
Sportspeople from Rostov Oblast